Lewis Bean (born 12 February 1992) is an English professional rugby union player who plays as a Lock for Glasgow Warriors. & currently serves in the British Army.

Rugby Union career

Amateur career

Bean played for the Army Rugby Union. He turned out for the Army against the Navy in the 100th anniversary match at Twickenham.

Bean played for Birmingham Moseley from 2017 to 2019.

Professional career

At the start of the 2019-20 season, he was training with Worcester Warriors. He played for the Warriors in the Premiership Rugby Cup and Premiership Shield.

However Bean was instead signed for the Northampton Saints for their 2019/20 season.

Bean was loaned to Glasgow Warriors in November 2020. He was named on the bench for the Warriors match away to Ulster. On 10 February 2021 it was announced that the deal would be made permanent for the coming season.

Bean returned to Northampton Saints for the rest of the season; but he was then loaned out to Bedford Blues. The Bedford side has a partnership deal with the Saints and this saw 12 Saints players, including Bean, move to the Blues for the close of the 2020–21 RFU Championship season.

Army career

Bean is a Corporal in the British Army based with The Rifles and has completed two tours of Afghanistan.

References

Living people
Glasgow Warriors players
Northampton Saints players
1992 births
English rugby union players
Rugby union locks
Moseley Rugby Football Club players
Worcester Warriors players
Bedford Blues players